Gibeauxiella bellaqueifontis is a moth in the family Cosmopterigidae. It is found in France. It was described from the Fontainebleau forest.

It is known from only one specimen which was caught in May on Ganoderma applanatum.

References

Moths described in 1986
Antequerinae
Moths of Europe